, born , was a Japanese professional sumo wrestler. He was the dominant wrestler in the sport during the 1970s. Kitanoumi was promoted to yokozuna at the age of 21, becoming the youngest ever to achieve sumo's top rank. He won 24 tournament championships during his career and was one of a series of truly great yokozuna who came from Hokkaido, the largest and northernmost prefecture of Japan. At the time of his death he still held the records for most tournaments at yokozuna (63) and most bouts won as a yokozuna (670), but they have since been surpassed. Following his retirement in 1985 he established the Kitanoumi stable. He was chairman of the Japan Sumo Association from 2002 until 2008, and again from 2012 until his death.

Career
Born in Sōbetsu, Hokkaido, Kitanoumi began his professional sumo career in January 1967 at the age of 13, whilst still in middle school. He joined Mihogaseki stable, and was promoted to sumo's second highest jūryō division in May 1971 and the top makuuchi division a year later. He won his first top division yūshō or tournament championship in January 1974 and was promoted to ōzeki immediately afterwards. He secured promotion to yokozuna just three tournaments after that. At 21 years 2 months, he was the youngest ever yokozuna, beating the previous record held by Taihō by one month.

Kitanoumi was the most successful wrestler in sumo for the rest of the 1970s. His dominance, and perceived stern demeanor, meant that he was not that popular with the general public. When he was defeated by underdog Takanohana in a playoff for the championship in September 1975, the audience threw so many zabuton—or cushions—into the ring in delight, that Kitanoumi said he could "hardly see the ceiling". He was known for not offering a defeated opponent a hand to get back to their feet, and was also notoriously monosyllabic when being interviewed by reporters. His best year was 1978, when he won five of the six tournaments and won 82 out of a possible 90 bouts, a record that stood until 2005. His chief rival during these years was Wajima, but Kitanoumi was much more consistent. He was heavy at 169 kg, was extremely strong and had excellent balance. He was also remarkably injury free and rarely missed a tournament. From July 1973 until September 1981 he chalked up 50 consecutive kachi-koshi, or tournament records of at least eight wins out of 15, which was a record for the top division until 2015, when Hakuhō reached 51 consecutive kachi-koshi.

By the beginning of the 1980s he had a new rival, Chiyonofuji, who earned promotion to ōzeki and then yokozuna by defeating him in decisive matches in January and July 1981. In November 1981 Kitanoumi withdrew from a tournament for the first time. After that his record was patchy, with many absences. His 24th and final title came in May 1984, with a perfect 15–0 record. This was seen by many as a fitting end to a great career and he wanted to retire after that tournament, but was persuaded by the Sumo Association to carry on until the opening of the new Ryōgoku Kokugikan stadium in January 1985. Three days into the tournament, without winning a match, he announced his retirement. He had been ranked as a yokozuna on the banzuke in 63 tournaments, which remained the most in history until Hakuhō surpassed it in May 2018. During his career he had won 951 matches, the most in history at the time (he was overtaken by Ōshio in 1987). Of those victories, 804 came in the top division (a record broken by Chiyonofuji in 1991), and 670 of those came at the yokozuna rank.

After retirement

Kitanoumi was honored for his great achievements by being offered membership of the Japan Sumo Association without having to purchase a share (ichidai toshiyori). He was the second rikishi after Taihō to be given this honor. As a result, he was able to keep his sumo name after retirement. He opened up his own training stable, Kitanoumi stable, taking several wrestlers from Mihogaseki stable who had already been under his wing. Kitanoumi stable became one of the largest in sumo, and produced a handful of top division wrestlers over the years, such as maegashira Ganyū, Kitazakura and Kitataiki. He also inherited Russian wrestler Hakurozan, who joined the stable in 2006.

In 2002 Kitanoumi became head of the Sumo Association. He was the first chairman under the age of 50 in half a century, and his appointment was widely welcomed; however, he came under pressure after a series of scandals hit sumo. These included the behavior of yokozuna Asashōryū, who was suspended for two tournaments in 2007 but then allowed to return to Mongolia, the death of junior wrestler Tokitaizan at Tokitsukaze stable, and the dismissal of several top wrestlers for using cannabis. When it became clear in September 2008 that one of them was his own wrestler Hakurozan, whom he had previously backed, Kitanoumi resigned his post, apologizing for "the trouble I have caused to the Sumo Association and to fans". He remained on the board of directors, in charge of running the Osaka tournament, but had to resign from that position in April 2011 after another of his wrestlers, Kiyoseumi, was found guilty of match-fixing and forced to retire from sumo. After Hanaregoma stepped down in February 2012, Kitanoumi returned to the role of chairman, becoming the first person to head the association twice.

Death
Kitanoumi died of colorectal cancer and multiple organ failure on the evening of November 20, 2015. He was in Fukuoka for the Kyushu tournament and was taken to the hospital for anemia in the morning, after which his condition deteriorated. A memorial service was held on December 22 at the Ryōgoku Kokugikan.

Fighting style
Kitanoumi's favorite kimarite or techniques were hidari-yotsu (a right hand outside, left hand inside grip on the opponent's mawashi), yorikiri (force out) and uwatenage (overarm throw).

Career record

See also
Glossary of sumo terms
Kanreki dohyō-iri 
List of past sumo wrestlers
List of sumo record holders
List of sumo tournament top division champions
List of sumo tournament top division runners-up
List of yokozuna

References

External links

 Japan Sumo Association profile

1953 births
2015 deaths
Deaths from cancer in Japan
Deaths from colorectal cancer
Deaths from multiple organ failure
Japanese sumo wrestlers
Sumo people from Hokkaido
Yokozuna